An immutable characteristic is any sort of physical attribute which is perceived as being unchangeable, entrenched and innate. The term is often used to describe segments of the population which share such attributes and are contrasted from others by those attributes, and is used in human rights law to classify protected groups of people who should be protected from civil or criminal actions which are directed against those immutable characteristics.

For example, a legal debate about sexual orientation concerns whether it is a mutable or immutable characteristic.  If it is immutable, then homosexuality, bisexuality, asexuality, heterosexuality, etc., are all immutable characteristics that naturally occur and cannot be changed.  If it is mutable, then those characteristics can be changed.

See also
Suspect classification

References

See also
Immutability (theology)

Collective rights
Human rights